Live on Broadway is a live album by singer-songwriter Barry Manilow, released in 1990. The album was recorded at the Chicago Theatre  in Chicago, Illinois, on December 2 and December 3, 1989.

Track listing

Track information and credits taken from the album's liner notes.

References

External links
Barry Manilow Official Site
Arista Records Official Site

1990 live albums
Live on Broadway
Arista Records live albums